The 1969 Campeonato Argentino de Rugby   was won by the selection of   Buenos Aires
that beat in the final the selection of  Cordoba.

That year in Argentine rugby 
 The Buenos Aires Champsionship was won by C.U.B.A.
 The Cordoba Province Championship was won by Córdoba Athletic
 The North-East Championship was won by Los Tarcos
 During the year the Scottish team visit Argentina in a tour.

Results 
Change the format: the selection of the union that host the "final four" was admitted directly to semifinals.

Semifinals 

 Buenos Aires: D. Morgan, M. Walther,  A. Rodríguez Jurado,  A. Travaglini,  M. Pascual,  C. Martínez,  L. Gradin,  H. Silva (cap.),  H. Miguens,  R. Loyola,  A. Anthony,  A. Otaño,  M. Farina,  R. Handley,  L. García Yáñez. 
Cuyo: J. Castro, J. Villanueva,  R: Tarquini,  E. Gandía,  C. Magnani, C. Navessi,  l. Chacón,  R. Portabella,  E. Casale,  E. Martínez, H. Martín,  C. González, O. Bempo,  L. Ramos,  R. Fariello (cap.)

 Cordoba: F. Mezquida,  J. Faya,  E. Meta,  H. Espinosa,  P. Barrios,  J. Ulla,  J. Vera,  E. Vaca Narvaja,  A. Resella,  R. Byleveld,  R. Campra (cap.),  R. Pasaglia,  C. Abud,  H. Bianchia,  G. Ribeca. 
Rosario= Seaton,  A. Quetglas,  C. Blanco,   J. Benzi,  E. España (cap.),  E. Ferraza,  O. Aletta de Sylva,  J. Imhoff,  J. L. Imhoff,  M. Chesta,  R. Suárez,  H. Suárez,  S. Furno,  R. Seaton,  F. Lando

Third place final 

 Cordoba: F. Mezquida,  L. Capell,  E: Mato,  M. Cappel,  H. Espinosa,  J. Tejo,  J. Vera,  R. Byleveld,  J. Aguirre,  E. Vaca Narvaja,  R. Campra (cap.),  R: Pasaglia,  G. Ribecca,  H. Bianchi,  C. Abud. 
Cuyo: Gandía,  C. Magnani,  R. Villanueva,  R. Fernández,  J. Villanueva,  C. Navessi,  L. Chacón,  E. Martínez,  A. Granata,  E. Casale,  H. Martín,  C. González,  R. Fariello (cap.),  L. Ramos,  O. Bempo.

Final 

 Buonos Aires : D. Morgan,  M. Walther,  A. Rodríguez Jurado,  A. Travaglini,  M. Pascual,  T. Harris Smith,  A. Etchegaray,  H. Silva (cap.),  H. Miguens,  R. Loyola,  A. Anthony,  A. Otaño,  R. Casabal,  R. Handley,  L. García Yáñez. 
Rosario J. Seaton,  A. Quetglas,  C. Blanco,  J. Benzi,  E. España (cap.), E. Ferraza,  O. Aletta de Sylva,  J. L. Imhoff,  M. Chesta,  J. Imhoff,  R. Suárez,  H. Suárez,  S. Furno,  R: Seaton,  F. Lando.

Bibliography 
  Memorias de la UAR 1969
  XXV Campeonato Argentino

Campeonato Argentino de Rugby
Argentina
Campeonato